Cerebral may refer to:

 Of or relating to the brain
 Cerebrum, the largest and uppermost part of the brain
 Cerebral cortex, the outer layer of the cerebrum
 Retroflex consonant, also referred to as a cerebral consonant, a type of consonant sound used in some languages
 Intellectual, rather than emotional

See also